Diósgyőr-Vasgyári Testgyakorlók Köre is a professional football club based in Miskolc, Hungary.

Matches

Notes
 1R: First round
 2R: Second round
 3R: Third round
 PR: Preliminary round
 1Q: First qualifying round
 2Q: Second qualifying round
 3Q: Third qualifying round

Record by country of opposition
Correct 

 P – Played; W – Won; D – Drawn; L – Lost

European Record
As of 24 April 2018.
Biggest win: 28/09/1977, Diósgyőr 5-0  Beşiktaş J.K., Diósgyőri Stadion, Miskolc
Biggest defeat: 20/08/1980,  Celtic 6-0 Diósgyőr, Celtic Park, Glasgow
Appearances in UEFA Cup Winners' Cup:  2
Appearances in UEFA Europa League:  2
Appearances in UEFA Intertoto Cup:  1
Player with most UEFA appearances: 12  Ferenc Oláh 
Top scorers in UEFA club competitions: 5  György Tatár

References

External links

Diósgyőri VTK
Hungarian football clubs in international competitions